Ruslan Tyumenbayev (born May 28, 1986, in Frunze) is a Kyrgyz wrestler who won the bronze medal in the Men's Greco-Roman 60 kg in the 2008 Summer Olympics in Beijing.

References

External links
 

1986 births
Living people
Sportspeople from Bishkek
Olympic bronze medalists for Kyrgyzstan
Olympic wrestlers of Kyrgyzstan
Wrestlers at the 2008 Summer Olympics
Olympic medalists in wrestling
Asian Games medalists in wrestling
Wrestlers at the 2006 Asian Games
Medalists at the 2008 Summer Olympics
Kyrgyzstani male sport wrestlers
Medalists at the 2006 Asian Games
Asian Games bronze medalists for Kyrgyzstan
20th-century Kyrgyzstani people
21st-century Kyrgyzstani people